The 2009 Belarusian Premier League was the 19th season of top-tier football in Belarus. It started on April 4 and ended on November 8, 2009. BATE Borisov were the defending champions.

Team changes from 2008 season
Due to league reduction from 16 to 14 teams three relegated teams (Lokomotiv Minsk, Savit Mogilev and Darida Minsk Raion, who finished 14th, 15th and 16th in 2008 respectively) were replaced by only one team, the winner of 2008 First League Minsk.

Overview
BATE Borisov won their 6th champions title and qualified for the next season's Champions League. The championship runners-up Dinamo Minsk, bronze medalists Dnepr Mogilev and yet to be determined 2009-10 Cup winners qualified for the Europa League. Due to decision to gradually reduce Premiere League to 12 clubs (14 in 2009, 12 in 2010) three lowest placed teams (Gomel, Granit MikashevichiSmorgon) relegated to the First League.

Teams and venues

Table

Results

Belarusian clubs in European Cups

Top goalscorers

Source: football.by

See also
2009 Belarusian First League
2008–09 Belarusian Cup
2009–10 Belarusian Cup

References

External links
 Official site 
 rsssf.com

Belarusian Premier League seasons
1
Belarus
Belarus